"Shop Around" is a song originally recorded by the Miracles on Motown Records' Tamla subsidiary label. It was written by Miracles lead singer Smokey Robinson and Motown Records founder Berry Gordy. It became a smash hit in 1960 when originally recorded by the Miracles, reaching number one on the Billboard R&B chart, number one on the Cashbox Top 100 Pop Chart,  and number 2 on the Billboard Hot 100 chart. It was the Miracles' first million-selling hit record, and the first-million-selling hit for the Motown Record Corporation. This landmark single was a multiple award winner for the Miracles, having been inducted into the Grammy Hall of Fame in 2006, inducted into The Rock and Roll Hall of Fame as one of The 500 Songs That Shaped Rock and Roll, and honored by Rolling Stone as #500 in their list of The 500 Greatest Songs of All Time, dropping it 5 spots from #495 in the 2004 version.

The Miracles original version

Background
The original version of "Shop Around" by the Miracles (credited as "The Miracles featuring Bill 'Smokey' Robinson"), was released in 1960 on Motown's Tamla label, catalog number T 54034. The song, written by Smokey Robinson and Berry Gordy, depicts a mother giving her now-grown son advice about how to find a woman worthy of being a girlfriend or wife ("My mama told me/'you better shop around'"). The original version of the song had a strong blues influence, and was released in the local area of Detroit, Michigan, before Gordy decided that the song needed to be re-recorded to achieve wider commercial appeal. At 3 a.m. one morning, the Miracles (Robinson, Claudette Rogers, Bobby Rogers, Ronnie White, and Pete Moore) recorded a new, poppier version of the song that became a major national hit. The original record label credits Bill "Smokey" Robinson as the writer, with Berry Gordy as producer. On the American Top 40 program of July 4, 1987, Casey Kasem reported that Gordy had previously rejected 100 songs by Robinson as "garbage" before accepting the 101st, "Shop Around," as "a hit."

The single was the first Motown record to be released in the UK, on Decca Records' London label. Pictured in the infobox is the subsequent EP release, coupling the "Shop Around" single with its follow-up, "Ain't It Baby". The two singles and the EP were the only Motown releases on the London label.

Reception
"Shop Around" was a big hit for the Miracles, becoming the group's first number 1 hit on the Billboard R&B singles chart, spending eight weeks at the top, and also hitting No. 2 on the Billboard Hot 100, behind "Calcutta" by Lawrence Welk. "Shop Around" also reached No. 1 on the Cashbox magazine Top 100 pop chart and is also noted for being the first million-selling record for the Miracles and for the Motown Record Corporation, as well as a 2006 Grammy Hall of Fame inductee. The B-side to "Shop Around", "Who's Lovin' You", also saw a plethora of covers, including a version by The Jackson 5 in 1969.

"Shop Around" inspired an answer record, "Don't Let Him Shop Around" by Debbie Dean. Dean's "Don't Let Him Shop Around" charted No. 92 on the Hot 100 in February 1961 and was Dean's only chart entry. Smokey Robinson later recorded a sequel song for his 1987 album One Heartbeat, entitled "It's Time to Stop Shopping Around".

Awards and accolades
 The Motown Record Corporation's first million-selling hit record.
 Inducted into the Grammy Hall of Fame in 2006.
 The Motown Record Corporation's first Billboard number-one R&B hit. It held the No. 1 position on the Billboard R&B Chart for 8 consecutive weeks.
 Ranked as No. 500 on Rolling Stones list of "The 500 Greatest Songs of All Time".
 Reached number one on the Cash Box magazine Pop chart.
 The first Motown Records song to reach the top 5 on the Billboard pop chart (No. 2).
 Honored by the Rock and Roll Hall of Fame as one of the "500 Songs That Shaped Rock and Roll".

Track listings
 "Shop Around" – 2:50
 "Who's Lovin' You" – 3:06

Chart performance

Weekly charts

Year-end charts

Personnel
The Miracles

Smokey Robinson - lead vocals, writer
Marv Tarplin - guitar
Claudette Rogers Robinson - background vocals
Pete Moore - background vocals
Ronnie White - background vocals
Bobby Rogers - background vocals

Additional personnel
Berry Gordy - piano, writer, producer
The Funk Brothers - other instrumentation
Joe Hunter - keyboards
James Jamerson - bass
Benny Benjamin - drums
Ron Wakefield - tenor saxophone
Mike Terry - baritone saxophone

Captain & Tennille version

Background
In 1976, the American pop music duo Captain & Tennille released their version of "Shop Around" for their second studio album, Song of Joy, issued on the A&M Records label. Toni Tennille changed the lyrics slightly so that they were sung from a woman's perspective. The "Shop Around" single was produced by the duo and featured the song "Butterscotch Castle" as its B-side. The single first entered the US Billboard Hot 100 chart on May 1, 1976, at number 62.

Reception
Released as the second single of Captain & Tennille from the Song of Joy album, their version of "Shop Around" was a success. The single reached number 4 in Canada on the RPM singles chart and peaked at number 4 on the US Hot 100 chart on July 9, 1976. While not out-charting The Miracles' original, their version became a gold record, and also topped the Billboard easy listening chart for one week in 1976.

Track listings
 "Shop Around" - 3:29
 "Butterscotch Castle" - 3:19

Chart performance

Weekly charts

Year-end charts

Personnel
Toni Tennille - piano, vocals, background vocal
Daryl Dragon - guitar, bass guitar, keyboards
Hal Blaine - drums, percussion
Gary Sims - bass vocal

See also
List of number-one R&B singles of 1961 (U.S.)
List of number-one adult contemporary singles of 1976 (U.S.)

References
Hits Of The Sixties: The Million Sellers by Demitri Coryton & Joseph Murrells, Batsford Ltd., 1990, (pg 43).

Notes

External links
 
 

1960 singles
1960 songs
1976 singles
The Miracles songs
Captain & Tennille songs
Johnnie Ray songs
Madness (band) songs
Grammy Hall of Fame Award recipients
Songs written by Smokey Robinson
Songs written by Berry Gordy
Tamla Records singles
A&M Records singles
Song recordings produced by Berry Gordy